Acherontas is a former municipality in Thesprotia, Epirus, Greece. Since the 2011 local government reform it is part of the municipality Souli, of which it is a municipal unit. The municipal unit has an area of 67.343 km2. It was named after the river Acheron. Population 2,146 (2011). The seat of the municipality was in Gardiki Souli.

References

Populated places in Thesprotia